René Morel (19 February 1912 – 3 April 1978) was a French middle-distance runner. He competed in the men's 800 metres at the 1932 Summer Olympics.

References

1912 births
1978 deaths
Athletes (track and field) at the 1932 Summer Olympics
French male middle-distance runners
Olympic athletes of France
Athletes from Paris